The discography of Pixies, an American alternative rock band, includes eight studio albums, twelve singles, seven compilations, one mini-LP, and five EPs .

Pixies formed in Boston, Massachusetts in 1985. Following their 1987 demo tape, the band signed to the English independent record label 4AD. They released Come On Pilgrim, comprising eight songs from their demo tape, in October 1987. Their first full-length album, Surfer Rosa, was released in 1988 on 4AD; an American distribution deal was agreed with Rough Trade Records several months later. However, Surfer Rosa did not see wide distribution in the United States.

Pixies agreed to a United States distribution deal with Elektra Records before releasing their third album, Doolittle. Doolittle was the most successful album for Pixies, earning them a gold certification from the Recording Industry Association of America in 1995 (along with Surfer Rosa in 2005). Following a hiatus in 1989, the band reconvened to release Bossanova in 1990 and Trompe le Monde in 1991, before breaking up in 1993. After reuniting in 2004, Black Francis, Joey Santiago, Kim Deal and David Lovering issued a download-only single, "Bam Thwok", and Warren Zevon cover, "Ain't That Pretty at All", as well as collaborating with Disc Live to release a number of reunion tour live albums in the same year.

In 2013, a week after the departure of bassist Kim Deal, the band released the song "Bagboy", and then EP1, consisting of four new songs. In 2014, Pixies released EP2 and EP3, and Indie Cindy—a full-length album combining the songs from EP1, EP2 and EP3.

Albums

Studio albums

Live albums 

The Pixies collaborated with Disc Live to release a string of limited edition live albums throughout 2004 as part of their reunion tour. This practice has been repeated with each successive tour, as well as documenting previous tours, using The Show and Coudal Partners/American Laundromat as distributing labels.  An incomplete list appears below.

Compilation albums

EPs

Singles

Other charted and/or certified songs

Bootlegs

Music videos

DVDs

Other appearances

See also
List of Pixies songs

Notes

References

Sources
Frank, Josh; Ganz, Caryn. "Fool the World: The Oral History of a Band Called Pixies." Virgin Books, 2005. .
Sisario, Ben. Doolittle 33⅓. Continuum, 2006. .

External links
 Official site
 Comprehensive discography
List of promotional items and records
 Thrashin's Pixies Page – Long Standing Fan Page with comprehensive discography & lyrics

Discography
Rock music group discographies
Discographies of American artists
Alternative rock discographies